Maharaj Sri Nagendra Singh (18 March 1914 – 11 December 1988) was an Indian lawyer and administrator who served as President of the International Court of Justice from 1985 to 1988. He was one of the four judges from India to have been Judges of the International Court of Justice in The Hague, the others being B. N. Rau (1952–1953), R. S. Pathak (1989–1991) the 18th Chief Justice of India, and Dalveer Bhandari (2012–), former Justice of the Supreme Court of India.

Early life
Singh was born in Dungarpur State of India as the third son of Bijaya Singh and Devendra Kunwar Sahiba. He was educated at Mayo College, Ajmer. He hails from a royal Rajput family.
Before joining the Civil Service he was educated at St John's College, Cambridge.

Career
He joined the Indian Civil Service and served as Regional Commissioner for the Eastern States, a member of the Constituent Assembly of India, joint secretary for India's Defense Ministry, Director-General of Transport, and special secretary in the Ministry of Information and Broadcasting.

Between 1966 and 1972 Singh was secretary to the President of India, then from 1 October 1972 to 6 February 1973 he was Chief Election Commissioner of India. In 1966, 1969, and 1975, he was appointed a representative of India in the United Nations Assembly and served on the United Nations International Law Commission on a part-time basis from 1967 to 1972. He was also elected as secretary of the International Bar Association. In 1973, he moved to The Hague to become a judge of the International Court of Justice and was its president between February 1985 and February 1988, when he retired.  He continued to live at the Hague and died there in December 1988.

Honours
Singh was awarded the Kama award in 1938, and in 1973 he received the Padma Vibhushan from the Government of India.

See also

External links

1914 births
1988 deaths
20th-century Indian judges
Alumni of St John's College, Cambridge
Chief Election Commissioners of India
Indian Civil Service (British India) officers
Indian judges of United Nations courts and tribunals
International Law Commission officials
Members of the Constituent Assembly of India
People from Dungarpur
Presidents of the International Court of Justice
Rajasthani people
Rajasthani politicians
Recipients of the Padma Vibhushan in public affairs
Members of the International Law Commission